Elma Shemsovikj (Macedonian: Елма Шемсовиќ, Elma Šemsović; born 4 February 1999) is a Macedonian footballer who plays as a midfielder for 1. liga club ŽFK Dragon 2014 and the North Macedonia women's national team.

References

1999 births
Living people
Women's association football midfielders
Macedonian women's footballers
North Macedonia women's international footballers
ŽFK Dragon 2014 players